Yosmany Romero (born 20 May 1976) is a Cuban wrestler. He competed in the men's freestyle 76 kg at the 2000 Summer Olympics.

References

External links
 

1976 births
Living people
Cuban male sport wrestlers
Olympic wrestlers of Cuba
Wrestlers at the 2000 Summer Olympics
People from Ciego de Ávila
Pan American Games silver medalists for Cuba
Pan American Games medalists in wrestling
Medalists at the 1999 Pan American Games
Wrestlers at the 1999 Pan American Games
20th-century Cuban people
21st-century Cuban people